Muskurahat may refer to:

 Muskurahat (1943 film), a Bollywood film. 
 Muskurahat (1992 film), a 1992 Hindi-language Indian film